Sisyrinchium bermudiana, known as Bermudiana or, along with other members of the genus, as blue-eyed grass, is a flower of the genus Sisyrinchium (of the iris family) that is indigenous to the Atlantic archipelago, and British Overseas Territory, of Bermuda. The plant appears and blooms in the spring. It has been used as a totemic flower by Bermudians, and appears in art, jewellery, banknotes and elsewhere. Long believed to be limited to Bermuda, the plant has also been found around Lough Erne and Lough Melvin in County Fermanagh, Northern Ireland, where it is known as feilistrín gorm, or blue-eyed grass.

Taxonomy
Sisyrinchium bermudiana was first described by Carl Linnaeus in 1753. The first described species in the genus Sisyrinchium, it is thus the type species. Linnaeus's specific epithet bermudiana was not an adjective (and thus does not have to agree in gender with Sisyrinchium) but a noun in apposition, derived from the earlier genus name Bermudiana. He showed this by capitalizing the epithet, but modern practice is to use lower-case for all epithets.

References

Flora of Bermuda
bermudiana
Plants described in 1753
Taxa named by Carl Linnaeus